The  (also known as the Isuzu F-Series) is a line of medium-duty commercial vehicles manufactured by Isuzu since 1970, following the earlier TY model which occupied the same slot in the market. All F-series trucks are cab over designs and the cabin comes fully built from the factory. Most models come with a diesel engine; but, some markets get CNG derivatives as well. The F-series is available a variety of cab styles, engines, 4WD or 2WD depending on the market it is sold. While Isuzu's main plant is in Japan, these trucks are locally assembled from CKD kits in numerous countries.

Most mid-size and big-size models of the truck are distinguishable by a front 'Forward' badge; but the common Isuzu badge is usually used on the rear. Confusingly, the smaller Isuzu Elf has been sold as the "GMC Forward" in the United States and other markets.

The Isuzu Forward is among the commercial grade trucks used by the Japan Ground Self-Defense Force for rear line duties.

Isuzu TY (predecessor)
Isuzu released the  TY-series in May 1966. This semi-cabover design was Isuzu's first medium-duty truck. The types were TY20, TY30, and TY40 depending on the length of the chassis. In August 1967 two  models, TY31(S) and TY41(S), were added. There was also an extra long wheelbase model (available with an extended cab) called the TY51. The TY range received a light facelift in March 1968, including a redesigned grille.

First generation (1970)

The first generation Forward (TR) was launched in April 1970, replacing the original TY-series. In July 1971 this engine was upgraded to produce . In September 1972 the Forward received a facelift and a new model code (SBR). The D500 engine was largely replaced with the new  6BB1 direct injection inline-six producing . Only certain lighter duty versions, such as the fire truck, retained the smaller D500 engine. The glowplug equipped 6BB1 had the smallest displacement per cylinder of any direct injection diesel engine in the world at the time and went on to power a large number of the Forward, the Elf, and many other Isuzu vehicles for the coming decades.

While most of the first generation Forward range was replaced in August 1975, the lighter short cab versions continued in production as the "Forward S" until replaced by Forward Juston in 1986.

Second generation (SBR/JBR/FBR) (1975)

The Second Generation Forward (SBR-series) was released in August 1975. The SBR was later complemented with new heavier-duty versions (J- and F-series) equipped with the larger 6BD1, 6BD1T, and 6BF1 engines.

 JBR/JCR/JDR (6-7t)
 FTM (10t)

Semi-tractor

 VDR (4.5t, 5t)

4WD

 SCS (4t)

Third generation (JCR/FTR/FVR/FSR/FRR/FVZ) (1985)

The third generation Forward was launched in June 1985 as the successor to the first and second generation forwards, the design is based on the 810's cab design and it was the first truck to win the Good Design Award.

The FTR, FVR, FSR and FRR are all equipped with naturally aspirated and turbocharged Isuzu 6BG1 and 6HE1 engines mated to the six-speed manual or NAVi6 six-speed automatic gearbox with an optional ABS. A 1992-1994 Isuzu Forward truck appears in a scene of Studio Ghibli's 1994 animated movie Pom Poko.

Fourth generation (1994)

The fourth generation Forward was released in February 1994 with all SOHC engines starting with the naturally aspirated or turbocharged 6HE1 until 1999 and replaced with the new 8.2 litre 6HH1 and 7.8 litre 6HK1-TC (also shared with the American-developed Isuzu H-series) engines mated to the six-speed manual or Isuzu's 'Smoother F' automatic gearbox, with Power Shift and HSA are standard equipment, only the ABS/ASR are optional.

For the Chilean and Peruvian markets, the trucks were shipped from Japan as CKD kits to Huechuraba, Chile, where up to two a day could be assembled by a team of 13 workers. They were badged as Chevrolets and GMCs until 2009.

Models
FTR (8 t)
FRR (4 t)
FSR (5 t, 6.5 t, 7 t)
FVR (9 t)
FVZ (10 t)
FRD (4 t)
FSD (5 t, 7 t)

Fifth generation (2007) 

The fifth generation Forward was launched in May 2007; all models are equipped with Isuzu 4H/6H engines. A new 6x6 variant was exhibited at the 43rd Tokyo Motor Show in 2013.

In North America, it was introduced in 2016 for the 2018 model year.

Current lineup

Japan/Worldwide
FRR
FSR
FSA
FTR
FVR
FVM
FVZ
FSS
FTS
GSR
GVR

Australia

Isuzu is the market leader in Australia and makes models unique to that market. It includes Crew cabs of popular models with options like 4X4 and PTO. Australia also receives slightly larger versions codenamed FX-series.
FRD
FSR
FSD
FTR
FVR
FVD
FVM
FVL
FVZ
GVD
FSS
FTS
FXR
FXD
FXZ
FXY
FXL
GXD

See also
Isuzu
Isuzu Giga
Isuzu Elf/Chevrolet W-Series/GMC W-Series

References

External links

  

Forward
Cab over vehicles